Nureyev is a crater on Mercury. It has a diameter of 16 kilometers, and has a bright and extensive ray system. Its name was adopted by the International Astronomical Union (IAU) on April 24, 2012. Nureyev is named for the Soviet and British ballet dancer Rudolf Nureyev.

Nureyev is east of Amru Al-Qays crater, and both are located southeast of the Caloris basin.

Views

References

Impact craters on Mercury